The 2019 FAM Youth Championship was the 8th season of the FAM Youth Championship.

Teams
9 teams participated in this year's Youth Championship. New Radiant prepared for the championship but they were unable to take part since they were suspended from all football activities due to financial reasons. On 30 January 2019, United Victory participated in the championship with New Radiant U21 players.

Personnel
Note: Flags indicate national team as has been defined under FIFA eligibility rules. Players may hold more than one non-FIFA nationality.

Group stage
From each group, the top two teams will be advanced for the Semi-finals.

All times listed are Maldives Standard Time. UTC+05:00

Group A

Group B

Knockout phase
The semi-finals were scheduled to play on 15 February and the final on 18 February 2020. Due to a cricket series – India-Maldives Friendship Cricket Series, organized by Ministry of Youth, Sports, and Community Empowerment, Cricket Board of Maldives and India Embassy in Maldives, scheduled to start on 15 February, in which Cabinet of the Maldives participates, Football Association of Maldives announced that the semi-finals will be played on 16 February and the final match will be played on 19 February 2019.

Bracket

Semi-finals

Final

Awards

Best 3 players
 Hassan Raif Ahmed (Club Eagles U21s)
 Shaifulla Ibrahim (Club Eagles U21s)
 Abdulla Yaameen (Club Green Streets U21s)

Best goalkeeper
 Maahy Abdulla (Victory U21s)

Fair play team
 Victory U21s

References

External links
 FAM Youth Championship at Facebook

FAM Youth Championship
2019 in Maldivian football